Work That may refer to:

 "Work That" (Mary J. Blige song), 2007
 "Work That" (Teriyaki Boyz song), 2009
 "Work That", a song by Megan Thee Stallion from her 2020 album Good News